Machiavellianism is widely defined as the political philosophy of the Italian Renaissance diplomat Niccolò Machiavelli.

Overview

After his exile from political life in 1512, Machiavelli took to a life of writing, which led to the publishing of his most famous work, The Prince. The book would become infamous for its recommendations for absolute rulers to be ready to act in unscrupulous ways, such as resorting to fraud and treachery, elimination of political opponents, and the usage of fear as a means of controlling subjects. Machiavelli's view that acquiring a state and maintaining it requires evil means has been noted as the chief theme of the treatise. He has become infamous for this advice, so much so that the adjective Machiavellian would later on describe a type of politics that is "marked by cunning, duplicity, or bad faith".

While Machiavelli has become widely popular for his work on principalities, his other major work,  The Discourses on Livy, focused mainly on republican statecraft, and his recommendations for a well ordered republic. Machiavelli noted how free republics have power structures that are better than principalities. He also notes how advantageous a government by a republic could be as opposed to just a single ruler. However, Machiavelli's more controversial statements on politics can also be found even in his other works. For example, Machiavelli notes that sometimes extraordinary means, such as violence, can be used in re-ordering a corrupt city. In one area, he praises Romulus, who murdered his brother and co-ruler in order to have power by himself to found the city of Rome. In a few passages he sometimes explicitly acts as an advisor of tyrants as well.

Some scholars have even asserted that the goal of his ideal republic does not differ greatly from his principality, as both rely on rather ruthless measures for aggrandizement and empire.

In one passage of The Prince, Machiavelli subverts the advice given by Cicero to avoid duplicity and violence, by saying that the prince should "be the fox to avoid the snares, and a lion to overwhelm the wolves". It would become one of Machiavelli's most notable statements.

Because cruelty and deception play such important roles in his politics, it is not unusual for related issues—such as murder and betrayal—to rear their heads with regularity.

Machiavelli's own concept of virtue, which he calls "virtù", is original and is usually seen by scholars as different from the traditional viewpoints of other political philosophers. Virtú can consist of any quality at the moment that helps a ruler maintain his state, even being ready to engage in necessary evil when it is advantageous.

Due to the treatise's controversial analysis on politics, in 1559, the Catholic Church banned The Prince, putting it on the Index Librorum Prohibitorum.

Machiavelli criticized and rejected the classical biblical and Christian thought as he viewed that it celebrated humility and otherworldly things, and thus it made the Italians of his day "weak and effeminate". While Machiavelli's own religious allegiance has been debated, it is assumed that he had a low regard of contemporary Christianity.

Realism and political opportunism
 

Machiavelli creates a set of beliefs for gaining, accruing, and keeping power for the times he was living in, regardless of morals, religious proscriptions, and teachings. In fact he teaches his readers that you must learn to be realistic rather than moral, and that one should care for one's own position for pragmatic reasons alone. Machiavelli says: "You can never satisfy the nobles by acting honorably, but you can satisfy the people. Regardless of how a prince comes to power, he should make every effort to win the good will of the people or, in times of trouble, he will have no hope. A prince must not delude himself about the reliability of the people, but nonetheless, a prince who makes good preparations and knows how to command will never be betrayed by them. A wise ruler will contrive to keep all his citizens dependent on him and on the state, and then he will be able to trust them." In other words the masses or standard people, the nobility or "the middle" of the classes are closer to the prince, and thus closer to the seat of power and thus can get his seat of power at some point. So what Machiavelli says you must get the people on your side, thus you can by pandering to the people and get them on your side so as to out maneuver the nobles and get around the problem of the nobility. "The top" of society is pointing to a section of society by making everyone at "the bottom" or the peasants to believe "the middle" is one the source of their problems. Machiavelli also say that you can't pay a man to die for you, money will not get everything, men just won't do it and they may get in a bit of danger, they have no fidelity, they are unfaithful, lazy, will also work for the opposition, won't take big risks and will run from the foe, but its never as useful as men who are opposite who will face danger and commit to hard work for the prince and are willing to die for him, it's for the sake of hiring citizens that creates good armies. "He blamed the mercenaries for lacking the spirit of soldiers who were defending their own lands and homes" and thus since they have spirit, like their homeland and wish to protect it, will readily serve the prince and will gladly do hard work and face danger.

Reception of Machiavelli
In the late 1530s, immediately following the publication of The Prince, Machiavelli's philosophy was seen as an immoral ideology that corrupted European politics. Reginald Pole read the treatise while he was in Italy, and on which he commented: "I found this type of book to be written by an enemy of the human race. It explains every means whereby religion, justice and any inclination toward virtue could be destroyed". Machiavelli's works were received similarly by other popular European authors, especially in Elizabethan England.  The English playwrights William Shakespeare and Christopher Marlowe incorporated their views into some of their works.  Shakespeare's titular character, Richard III, refers to Machiavelli in Henry VI, Part III, as the "murderous Machiavel".

The Anti-Machiavel is an 18th-century essay by Frederick the Great, King of Prussia and patron of Voltaire, rebutting The Prince. It was first published in September 1740, a few months after Frederick became king.  Denis Diderot, the French philosopher, viewed Machiavellianism as "an abhorrent type of politics" and the "art of tyranny".

See also

References

External links
Machiavelli, Niccolò -- Internet Encyclopedia of Philosophy
Niccolo Machiavelli, Encyclopedia Britannica
Great Thinkers- Machiavelli

16th-century neologisms
Machiavellianism
Eponymous political ideologies
Renaissance philosophy
Psychological manipulation